Stephanie Clayton (July 9, 1977) is a Democratic member of the Kansas House of Representatives representing the 19th district (Overland Park in Johnson County). She has served since 2013. She was elected as a Republican, but announced she was changing her party affiliation on December 19, 2018.

On November 15, 2019, she announced her candidacy for the 7th district seat in the Kansas Senate. On January 21, 2020, she announced that she was ending her campaign for the Kansas Senate and would seek reelection to a fifth term in the Kansas House of Representatives.

On March 10, 2020, she was appointed as ranking minority member of the House Education Committee. Representative Clayton assumed the posts of minority whip and ranking minority member of the Commerce, Labor and Economic Development Committee in January 2021.

Kansas House of Representatives

2021-2022 Committees
Ranking Minority Member of Commerce, Labor and Economic Development
Federal and State Affairs
Taxation
Redistricting
Rules and Journal

2019-2020 Committees
Ranking Minority Member of Education (March 10, 2020 – January 11, 2021)
Federal and State Affairs
Member of Education (January 15, 2019 - March 10, 2020)
Taxation
2019 Special Committee on Federal and State Affairs

2017-2018 Committees
Vice Chairman of Social Services Budget
Federal and State Affairs
Commerce, Labor and Economic Development

2015-2016 Committees
Federal and State Affairs
Agriculture and Natural Resources Budget
Social Services Budget

2013-2014 Committees
Utilities and Telecommunications
Transportation and Public Safety Budget
Local Government

References

External links
State Legislature Page
Ballotpedia

Members of the Kansas House of Representatives
Women state legislators in Kansas
Living people
Kansas Republicans
21st-century American politicians
21st-century American women politicians
Kansas Democrats
1977 births